CJFY-FM is a Canadian radio station in Miramichi, New Brunswick broadcasting at 96.5 MHz in Miramichi, and at 107.7 MHz in Blackville. The station broadcasts a Contemporary Christian music format and is owned by Miramichi Fellowship Center, Inc.

History
CJFY has been on the air since 2004, originally at 107.5 FM.

In 2007, CJFY Blackville was authorized to move from 107.5 to 107.7 FM.

On October 28, 2011, Miramichi Fellowship Center, Inc. applied to add a new FM transmitter in Blackville. If approved, the new transmitter will operate at 96.5 MHz in Miramichi and 107.7 MHz in Blackville. On May 18, 2012, Miramichi Fellowship Center, Inc. received approval from the Canadian Radio-television and Telecommunications Commission (CRTC) to operate a new english-language FM radio station at Miramichi.

See also
CT-20
Christian radio

References

External links
Life Radio
 

Mass media in Miramichi, New Brunswick
Jfy
Jfy
Radio stations established in 2004
2004 establishments in New Brunswick